The 2022 Saratov Oblast gubernatorial election took place on 9–11 September 2022, on common election day. Acting Governor Roman Busargin was elected to a full term.

Background
Valery Radaev served as Governor of Saratov Oblast since 2012, when he was confirmed in the position by Saratov Oblast Duma. Governor Radaev won his second term in 2017 election with 74.63% of the vote. In October 2021 during a dispute with Saratov Oblast Duma member Nikolai Bondarenko, Radaev made a comment that he wouldn't seek re-election in 2022. Despite Radaev's comments and other rumours about his potential departure, the governor had a powerful ally in State Duma Speaker Vyacheslav Volodin, which strengthened his position. However, on 10 May 2022 Valery Radaev asked to resign along with four other governors, Chairman of the Government of Saratov Oblast Roman Busargin was appointed acting Governor of Saratov Oblast. After his appointment, Busargin didn't resign from his previous position, instead combining the offices of Governor and Prime Minister of Saratov Oblast.

Due to the start of Russian special military operation in Ukraine in February 2022 and subsequent economic sanctions, the cancellation and postponement of direct gubernatorial elections was proposed. The measure was even supported by A Just Russia leader Sergey Mironov. Eventually, on 10 June Saratov Oblast Duma called the gubernatorial election for 11 September 2022.

Candidates
Only political parties can nominate candidates for gubernatorial election in Saratov Oblast, self-nomination is not possible. However, candidates are not obliged to be members of the nominating party. Candidate for Governor of Saratov Oblast should be a Russian citizen and at least 30 years old. Each candidate in order to be registered is required to collect at least 6% of signatures of members and heads of municipalities (191–200 signatures). Also, gubernatorial candidates present three candidacies to the Federation Council and election winner later appoints one of the presented candidates.

Registered
 Olga Alimova (CPRF), Member of State Duma, 2017 gubernatorial candidate
 Roman Busargin (United Russia), acting Governor of Saratov Oblast, Chairman of the Government of Saratov Oblast
 Artem Chebotarev (SR-ZP), Member of Saratov City Duma, professional boxer
 Dmitry Pyanykh (LDPR), former Member of State Duma (2020–2021)
 Aleksandr Vantsov (Rodina), attorney, former Member of Saratov City Duma (2007–2020)

Failed to qualify
 Igor Kalganov (PVR), businessman

Eliminated at convention
 Aleksey Sidorov (United Russia), Member of Saratov City Duma, businessman

Declined
 Aleksandr Anidalov (CPRF), Member of Saratov Oblast Duma
 Nikolai Bondarenko (CPRF), former Member of Saratov Oblast Duma (2017–2022)
 Valery Rashkin (CPRF), former Member of State Duma (1999–2022), 2000 gubernatorial candidate

Candidates for Federation Council
Incumbent Senator Sergey Arenin was not renominated.
Olga Alimova (CPRF):
Aleksandr Anidalov, Member of Saratov Oblast Duma
Nikolay Bondarenko, former Member of Saratov Oblast Duma (2017–2020)
Vladimir Yesipov, Member of Saratov Oblast Duma

Roman Busargin (United Russia):
Aleksey Chumachenko, Rector of Saratov State University
Andrey Denisov, former Ambassador of Russia to China (2013–2022)
Natalya Kvitchuk, chief doctor at Saratov city polyclinic №16

Artem Chebotarev (SR-ZP):
Dmitry Gormiov, businessman
Anton Kadukhin, Chebotarev's associate
Yelena Zykova

Igor Kalganov (PVR):
Ruslan Irsayev, manager
Igor Nikitin, pensioner
Oleg Shkil, Member of Balakovo Council

Dmitry Pyanykh (LDPR):
Nikita Grigoryevsky, Member of Saratov City Duma
Sergey Lityak, Member of Saratov City Duma
Maksim Ramikh, Member of Balakovo Council

Aleksandr Vantsov (Rodina):
Sergey Demin, chairman of Rodina regional office, businessman
Andrey Kornev, engineer
Sergey Ivannikov, pensioner

Results

|- style="background-color:#E9E9E9;text-align:center;"
! style="text-align:left;" colspan=2| Candidate
! style="text-align:left;"| Party
! width="75"|Votes
! width="30"|%
|-
| style="background-color:;"|
| style="text-align:left;"| Roman Busargin (incumbent)
| style="text-align:left;"| United Russia
| 716,974
| 72.55
|-
| style="background-color:|
| style="text-align:left;"| Olga Alimova
| style="text-align:left;"| Communist Party
| 140,198
| 14.19
|-
| style="background-color:|
| style="text-align:left;"| Artem Chebotarev
| style="text-align:left;"| A Just Russia — For Truth
| 56,606
| 5.73
|-
| style="background-color:;"|
| style="text-align:left;"| Dmitry Pyanykh
| style="text-align:left;"| Liberal Democratic Party
| 44,617
| 4.52
|-
| style="background-color:;"|
| style="text-align:left;"| Aleksandr Vantsov
| style="text-align:left;"| Rodina
| 20,756
| 2.10
|-
| style="text-align:left;" colspan="3"| Valid votes
| 979,151
| 99.08
|-
| style="text-align:left;" colspan="3"| Blank ballots
| 9,033
| 0.91
|- style="font-weight:bold"
| style="text-align:left;" colspan="3"| Total
| 988,194
| 100.00
|-
| style="background-color:#E9E9E9;" colspan="6"|
|-
| style="text-align:left;" colspan="3"| Turnout
| 988,194
| 53.71
|-
| style="text-align:left;" colspan="3"| Registered voters
| 1,839,804
| 100.00
|-
| colspan="5" style="background-color:#E9E9E9;"|
|- style="font-weight:bold"
| colspan="4" |Source:
|
|}

Former Ambassador to China Andrey Denisov (Independent) was appointed to the Federation Council, replacing incumbent Senator Sergey Arenin (Independent).

See also
2022 Russian gubernatorial elections

References

Saratov Oblast
Saratov Oblast
Politics of Saratov Oblast